Ángeles S.A. (Angels Inc.) is a 2007 Spanish family film released on December 21, 2007. It stars María Isabel in her first film.

Plot
Carlos (Pablo Carbonell) is a happily married man with a loving wife Julia (Silvia Marsó) and father of two children, María Isabel and Dani (Óscar Casas). One day, María performs an singing audition at school (“El Mundo Al Revés”)and gets selected for a festival that is happening there. However on the same day, her father goes to a business conference in China to sell his angel figurines.

During the airplane trip, he dies in a plane crash and goes to heaven. He meets Simona (Anabel Alonso), the head angel and eventually convinces her to let him become his daughter’s guardian angel because she doesn’t still have one. She does this by placing him inside the body of María’s music teacher after dying in a car accident and thus becomes his daughters guardian angel.

However things change, he finds out that his wife is going to marry his enemy Luis (Juanjo Pardo) and María runs away from home after not liking the idea. Her father goes to look for her and finds her at school. Later Julia stays with her partner for dinner and the teacher acts as babysitter for Dani and María. During the evening, Luis tells her that he has to go on a trip and Julia breaks up with him after not liking his idea.

After reflecting on his errors, he tells her that he is not going on a trip because the most important thing is her and her family. On the day of the school festival, María stays in her room as she doesn’t want to go. An angel finds her and tells her that she can sing the song she had composed for her father since her rival student Jennifer is having chronic flatulence attacks and can’t sing. This is because the head angel has enchanted a piece of glass with magic that she touched.

María Isabel finally interprets her song with lyrics relating to how much she misses her father (“Cuando No Estás” meaning “Now you’re not here”). Afterwards her father appears and says goodbye to her. María Isabel accepts her mother's boyfriend as a father and they become a happy family again.

DVD features
There is a special release of the film that came with a replica of the necklace that María Isabel wears throughout the movie. The DVD of the film was released in Region 2 only.

Music Videos: 'El Mundo Al Revés' and 'Cuando No Estás'
Making of Ángeles S.A.
Cast Interviews
Photo gallery
Trailers

Cast

Soundtrack
The fourth album by María Isabel is also the soundtrack for the film. It was released on November 27, 2007.

Track listing
Mis Ojos Caramelo
Angelitos Buenos
En Este Instante
El Mundo Al Revés
Cuando No Estás
Entre Montañas
Baila A Mi Vera
Dime Por Qué
Angelitos
Cuando No Estás (instrumental)
El Mundo Al Revés (instrumental)
Angelitos Buenos (instrumental)

See also
 List of films about angels

References

External links 

 Ángeles S.A. at ICAA's Catálogo de Cinespañol

María Isabel albums
2007 soundtrack albums
2006 television films
2006 films
Films about Halloween
Spanish children's films
2000s teen comedy films
Spanish fantasy comedy films
Single-artist film soundtracks
Comedy film soundtracks
Films about angels
Atresmedia Cine films
2000s Spanish films
2000s Spanish-language films